"Wait" is a song by the English rock band the Beatles from their 1965 album Rubber Soul. The song is credited to the Lennon–McCartney partnership. In the 1997 book Many Years from Now, Paul McCartney recalls it as entirely his work. In a 1970 interview with Ray Connolly, John Lennon could not remember writing it, saying, "That must be one of Paul's."

Origin and recording
The song was originally recorded for Help! in June 1965, but was rejected for inclusion on the album. When Rubber Soul fell one song short for a Christmas release, the Beatles revisited "Wait". Overdubs were added to the initial recording so it would blend in better with the more recent songs on Rubber Soul.

In the view of authors Jean-Michel Guesdon and Philippe Margotin, the lyrics "probably reflected his [McCartney's] complex relationship with Jane Asher: 'I am often away, but if you really love me, wait for me'". The vocals on the verse are shared between Lennon and McCartney, and McCartney sings the two middle eight sections. For his guitar part, George Harrison uses a volume pedal, which he earlier employed on "I Need You" and "Yes It Is".

Reception
Richie Unterberger of AllMusic writes that the song, while not one of the best on Rubber Soul, still fits in with the album comfortably enough. He compliments the song's "sorrowful melodies", calling them one of the most sorrowful of the Lennon–McCartney library, and notes that it's one of the few Beatles songs to be in a minor key. In his review for the 50th anniversary of Rubber Soul, Jacob Albano of Classic Rock Review writes: "'Wait' features great choruses and a decent bridge by McCartney along with a creative percussive ensemble and pedal-effected guitars", but concludes by calling it an otherwise weak song for its parent album.

Personnel
According to Ian MacDonald:
John Lennon – double tracked vocal, rhythm guitar
Paul McCartney – double tracked vocal, bass guitar
George Harrison – lead guitar
Ringo Starr – drums, maracas, tambourine

Notes

Bibliography

External links
 

The Beatles songs
Song recordings produced by George Martin
Songs written by Lennon–McCartney
Songs published by Northern Songs
1965 songs